The English Women's Open Amateur Stroke Play Championship is the national women's amateur stroke play golf championship in England. Entry is open to all amateur golfers. It has been played annually at since 1984 and is organised by the England Golf. Originally it was a close event, restricted to English golfers, becoming open in 2009.

Winners

Source:

References

External links
England Golf

Golf tournaments in England
Amateur golf tournaments in the United Kingdom
Women's golf in the United Kingdom
Annual sporting events in the United Kingdom
1984 establishments in England
Recurring sporting events established in 1984